Obornjača is an uninhabited village in Serbia. It is situated in the Bačka Topola municipality, in the North Bačka District, Vojvodina province.

Name
In Serbian the settlement is known as Obornjača (Оборњача) and in Hungarian as Nagyvölgy. There is a nearby settlement with the same name, but it administratively belongs to the neighbouring municipality of Ada (See: Obornjača (Ada)).

History
In 1975, the village had about 40 houses and 220 inhabitants. According to 2002 census, the population of the village numbered only 2 inhabitants, both of them ethnic Hungarians. According to 2011 census, the village was uninhabited.

References

See also
List of places in Serbia
List of cities, towns and villages in Vojvodina

Places in Bačka
Former populated places in Serbia